Stoychev is a Bulgarian surname.

 Borislav Stoychev (born 1986), Bulgarian footballer
 Bozhidar Stoychev (born 1991), Bulgarian footballer
 Georgi Stoychev (born 1977), Bulgarian footballer
 Petar Stoychev (born 1976), Bulgarian swimmer
 Radostin Stoychev (born 1969), volleyball player and coach
 Stayko Stoychev (born 1989), Bulgarian footballer
 Trendafil Stoychev (born 1953), Bulgarian weightlifter
 Vladimir Stoychev (1892–1990), Bulgarian general, diplomats and equestrian

Bulgarian-language surnames